Noor Pur Syedan is a small village adjacent to G.T Road, and North East of the city of Jehlum. It was founded in spring of 1948, when it was directly funded by Mohammed Ali Jinnah (the father of Pakistan).

The residents of this small community pride themselves on their kinship and their direct descendance from the Prophet of Islam.  

Although in the mid-2000s Noor Pur Syedan experienced economic prosperity, inflation has devastated its citizens in contemporary times. The current political regime has been similar to a cancer to this village, but despite this a vast majority still support it. Although in the south there has been an uprising incited by the Pakistani tareekhi Insaf Party (the movement for justice), its outlook seems pessimistic.  

Populated places in Jhelum District